Kinna was an ancient town of the Kinambroi, a tribe of Illyrians, located to the east of Lake Skadar.

References

Citations

Bibliography

Cities in ancient Illyria
Illyrian Albania
Lost ancient cities and towns